At least three commercial ships were named Dora in the late 19th and early 20th centuries:

 Dora, launched in 1880 for use in the coastal trade between California and Alaska.
 Dora, launched in 1889 for use by the London and South Western Railway, was renamed the SS Douglas.
 Dora, a 13-ton sloop built in 1892 that foundered Aug. 27, 1911 at Charleston, South Carolina.
 Dora (sternwheeler), a 1910 steamboat in Oregon 
 SS Dora, a Design 1022 ship launched in 1919 as SS Inspector, converted into a tanker, and subsequently renamed SS Comol Cuba

Ship names